The Union Railroad  is a Class III switching railroad located in Allegheny County in Western Pennsylvania. The company is owned by Transtar, Inc., which is itself a subsidiary of Fortress Transportation and Infrastructure Investors, after being purchased from United States Steel in 1988. The railroad's primary customers are the three plants of the USS Mon Valley Works, the USS Edgar Thomson Steel Works (blast furnaces, basic oxygen steelmaking, and continuous slab casting), the USS Irvin Works (hot and cold rolling mills and finishing lines) and the USS Clairton Works (producer of coke for blast furnace ironmaking).

History
Andrew Carnegie had been discussing rail transport with other lines, but determined the best way to protect his interests was to control the rail line himself. Several smaller companies had constructed sections of the route. "Bear Creek Railroad (name changed to Shenango and Allegheny Railroad Co.) was incorporated in March 1865 for the purpose of moving coal 21 miles from Pardoe to Shenango for delivery to other railroads and the Erie Extension Canal. By 1883, Shenango and Allegheny had extended north to Greenville, Pennsylvania, and south to Butler, Pennsylvania. By 1892, the line had extended north to reach the port of Conneaut, Ohio. The extensions carried their own descriptive corporate names and survived a series of corporate reorganizations to become the Pittsburgh, Shenango and Lake Erie." The rail line had been completed as far as Butler, still 40 miles distant from the Mon Valley. The first ore boat arrived in Conneaut in 1892 stimulating the interest of Andrew Carnegie. In April 1896, a tri-party agreement between PS&LE, Union Railroad Company and Carnegie Steel Company called for construction of a line from Butler to East Pittsburgh. The Butler and Pittsburgh Railroad Company incorporated April 8, 1896 and completed, spectacularly, by October 27, 1897 including a long, single track bridge across the Allegheny River. Also in 1897, PS&LE and B&P were consolidated into the Pittsburgh, Bessemer & Lake Erie under majority ownership of Carnegie. The Union Railroad or as some call "railroad in the sky" was created 1896. The railroad, as it exists today, has resulted from the union of five different railroads between the years 1906 and 1915.  The original URR extended from East Pittsburgh to Hays, a distance of six miles, and was constructed in the years 1894–1907.

Four years later, Carnegie formed the Bessemer and Lake Erie Railroad under this exclusive ownership and arranged to lease PS&LE for 999 years. This arrangement stayed in place with the formation of U. S. Steel in 1901, which bought out Carnegie interests.

The Union was expanded to include the several other mills in the Mon Valley Region. The Union was responsible for the various switching task within each mill, for delivering raw materials to each mill (which would arrive on the Union via interchange with the Bessemer & Lake Erie, another US Steel owned and operated railroad) and for delivering the finished products to interchange with the major railroads in the area (most notable the Pennsylvania, the Baltimore & Ohio and the Pittsburgh & Lake Erie).

In 1906, B&LE leased, and later sold, to Union Railroad the portion of line between North Bessemer and East Pittsburgh.

At its peak, the Union served eight separate steel mills and numerous other businesses (see below for complete list)- USS Homestead, USS Rankin, USS Edgar Thomson, USS Duquesne-National, USS National Tube & Pipe, USS Clairton, the relatively new USS Irvin rolling mill and Grant Steel in Duquesne, Pennsylvania. The URR also used four bridges crossing the Monongahela River - Union Railroad Port Perry Bridge, Union Railroad Clairton Bridge, McKeesport Connecting Railroad Bridge (also known as: Union Railroad Riverton Bridge), Carrie Furnace Hot Metal Bridge (also known as: Union Railroad Rankin Hot Metal Bridge) - and was one of the busy railroads in the United States by tonnage hauled. Unlike the rest of the steel industry, the Union was relatively accepting of modernization as demonstrated by construction of a then state-of-the-art yard and dispatching center in Duquesne, Pennsylvania, in the early 1950s. With the decline of the steel industry in the United States, the Union's operations were greatly scaled back.

Today main transportation is iron ore from North Bessemer interchange. Edgar Thomson gets it coke from the Clairton works that is also interchanged to Dexter yard, slabs from Edgar Thomson to Irvin works and finished steel products (coils) from Irvin works to the interchanges. Only the Port Perry Bridge remains open for rail traffic. For inner-mill service the Edgar Thomson plant uses US Steel own EMD-switchers to move the hot metal subs and for tressel unloading. Crews from the URR have their own motive power EMD's for general switching duties within the mill. Their duties include the movement of loaded ore and coke cars to the staging yard and tressel, spotting and pulling the caster and slab mills, along with bringing in scrap and flux cars into the BOP "Basic Oxygen Process". After closing the Riverton bridge in 2008 there is no rail connection between the URR network and Mckeesport Tubular Operations "Camp Hill". Using URR motive power to switch McKeesport Tubular is the duty of McKeesport Connecting Railroad (MKC), another subsidiary of Transtar. The Duquesne Coal Docks are still in operations unloading scrap metal from barges to be used at Edgar Thomson and coal barges to interchange with Norfolk Southern in the Kenny Yard.
Union Railroad continues to serve the Mon Valley and have since expanded its customer base to include Dura-Bond pipe coating in the former Duquesne Works site and General Electric in West Mifflin hauling special oversize generators.

Historical timeline and notable facts

 1894–1907 –  The original URR extended from East Pittsburgh to Hays, a distance of six miles.
 July 2, 1894 –  Union Railroad came into existence
 1895 – Received the heaviest and most powerful locomotive built to that date.
 1896 – Incorporated
 October 26, 1897 – the first 30-car ore train from North Bessemer yard through the new North Bessemer Tunnel to Edgar Thompson Steel Mill
 At year's end 5 million tons of freight cars traveled over the URR.
 June 30, 1898 – The first train over the newly completed Port Perry Bridge
 December 31, 1900 – Carrie Furnace bridge opened to hot metal traffic.
 June 14, 1901 –  Carrie Furnace bridge open for general traffic.
 December 1907 –  Completion of the Homestead connection between Port Perry Bridge and the north end of Munhall Yard
 1917- 1920 –  The Clairton Branch of the Monongahela Southern Railroad was constructed, it extended from Clairton Junction (Bull Run) to a connection with the St. Clair Terminal Railroad in Clairton and was first opened to operations on April 14, 1919.
 June 10, 1950 –  Dedication Of the New Union Railroad Diesel Shop Hall, Pennsylvania, a state-of-the-art servicing facility for their increasing diesel fleet.
 Year's end 1951 – all-time high of 74,440,776 net tons of revenue freight were handled. The largest concentration of freight in the world.

Interchanges
Penn Hills Twp (North Bessemer)
B&LE (CN)
Unity
East Pittsburgh (Dexter Yard)
CSX
P&LE @ Union JCT
PRR @ Valley Yard
McKeesport (Riverton)
CSX
Kenny Yard
Norfolk Southern
PRR
West Mifflin (Mifflin Junction)
Wheeling and Lake Erie Railway
P&WV and MTR
Clairton(Peter's Creek and Conley Yards)
Norfolk Southern
Wheeling and Lake Erie Railway
PWV and PRR
P&LE @ Wylie

Notable facilities

Steel mills
U.S. Steel Homestead Works - Homestead, Pennsylvania - Steel Operations ceased in 1986. Razed in late 80's. Shopping area called The Waterfront opened in 1999.
U.S. Steel Carrie Furnace - Rankin, Pennsylvania - Part of the Rivers of Steel National Heritage Area
U.S. Steel Edgar Thomson Steel Works - Braddock, Pennsylvania - Andrew Carnegie's first steel mill completed in 1875. Still in operation.  Oldest integrated steel mill in the world.
U.S. Steel Duquesne Works - Duquesne, Pennsylvania - Steel operations ended 1984.  Razed in late 1990s. now RIDC Park with a U.S. Steel Training Hub
U.S. Steel Mon Valley Works - Irvin Plant - West Mifflin, Pennsylvania - Constructed 1937-1938, still in operation - Rolling mills and finishing operations.
U.S. Steel Clairton Works - Clairton, Pennsylvania - Steel mill operation ended in 1984 - Coke Works continues to operate and produce coke and coke by-products.  Largest coking facility in North America.
U.S. Steel National Works - McKeesport, Pennsylvania - Original operations ended in 1987. Pipe and Tube works operations resumed in 2011 after purchase of remaining pipe mills from Camp Hill Corporation.

Yards
Prior to 1980 Reading from the northernmost point south.
North Bessemer Yards - North Bessemer was made up of six yards plus car shop tracks(Penn Hills Twp)Along with Interchange tracks with the Unity Junction and the Bessemer and Lake Erie.
Northbound Empty Yard, Cabbage Patch, North Yard, South Yard, East Yard and West Yard
 Hershey Siding Universal
North Yard - (Penn Hills Twp)
Hall Yard - Hall Roundhouse Hall, Pennsylvania
Oak Hill - South of Hall was made up of four yards (Monroeville and Wilkins Twp)
Santiago Yard, Peterson Yard, South Yard and Newtown Yard
Edgar Thomson Yards Braddock, Pennsylvania are as follows: *Valley Yard, Rail Yard, Joe Wolfe, Ore Yard,Port Perry Yard.
Homestead and Rankin Yards as follows: *Munhall A Yard and Munhall B Yard, Farm Yard, C, D, E, and F Yards, Hays Yard, West Run Yard
Duquesne Yards - Classification Yard Duquesne - Orchard, Swamp, Duquesne Furnace, Duquesne PVC, Duquesne Coal Docs
Mifflin Junction Yards - Mifflin Junction in West Mifflin
Homestead Yards -
Irvin "A" Yard Storage
Irvin "B" Yard Empty and Loaded Slab Racks
Clairton "E" Yard Empty Hoppers
Clairton "C" Yard Empty Tanks
Clairton "B" Yard Loaded Hoppers

Bridges
URR Port Perry Bridge - over Monongahela River between Port Perry (North Versailles Twp) and Duquesne
Union Railroad Coal Valley Bridge, Wilson, Pa - Over Rt 837 and the former PRR Mon Branch now Norfolk Southern RR
No Longer In Use (by the railroad)
URR Rankin Hot Metal Bridge - over Monongahela River between Rankin and Whitaker
URR Riverton Bridge - over Monongahela River between Duquesne and McKeesport Part of the Great Allegheny Passage Rails to Trails network
URR Clairton Bridge - over Monongahela River between Clairton and Belle Bridge (Lincoln Borough)

Tunnels
North Bessemer Tunnel - between North Bessemer and Universal (Penn Hills Twp)
Dravosburg Tunnel - between West Mifflin (south of West Mifflin Park) and Dravosburg
Airport Tunnel - under runway 10-28 and taxiway A of Allegheny County Airport in West Mifflin

Local businesses once served
Universal Atlas Concrete Penn Hills
Chambers Dump
Butler Refractories
Westinghouse Linhart division - Wemco E.Pgh
Linde Air
84 Lumber
General Electric Generators
Pittsburgh Alloy Inc
Risher Dump
Taylor Dump
Brown's Dump
Continental Can Company
Joseph M. Alfery & Associates
Shwayder Bros., Inc Chair mfg co. Mifflin
Tube City on the site of the former United Iron and Metal Company
General Motors Fisher Body
Ford Motor Co.
Grant Steel

Roster
The Union RR has operated a number of locomotives over the years.  In steam days, the railroad was the only operator of 0-10-2 During the steam days it also was known to run 2-8-0 "Consolidations" and 0-6-0.  The 0-6-0 were built by Lima and were significantly heavier than the USRA 0-6-0. In its height of operation, as much as 115 locomotives operated at once, including the current 33 locomotives on the roster. Among the more notable steam locomotives on the Union Railroad roster was engine 95 a 2-10-0 that was the most powerful locomotive built at its time (1895). Engine 115 a 2-8-0 appeared in a few promotional pictures for local charities.    Common 0-6-0 switchers included engines 77, 118 (built by Baldwin), 119, 120 and 163.  Oversized 0-6-0s were built for the railroad in 1936 by Lima and included engines 187 and 188.  There were 6 of these ordered. Most Union Railroad 0-6-0 switchers did not have the sloping tenders (although a few did) but maintained a traditional designed tender (for non switchers).  The famous 0-10-2 "Unions" were built by Baldwin and were numbered 301-310.  
From 1941 until 1953 the URR would gradually replace their fleet of steam locomotives with diesel motive power.
 

In the years after 1970 some used engines (eleven EMD SW9 and six EMD SD9 from the DM&IR, five SD38-2 from the B&LE and few from other roads) and three new EMD SW1001 joined the URR.

The current roster is made up completely of second generation EMD Switcher Units. Majority of the switchers are painted blue but numerous units are painted different colors including #3 and #17 are painted green, while #1 and #33 have a new yellow and red scheme.

Unique locomotive power

The Union Railroad was unique given that it was basically a switching railroad and yet its loads were incredibly heavy made up of either; ore, coke, coal, slag or steel.  This unique combination in addition to the steep grades around Pittsburgh demanded some special tractive force. 
In 1898 the largest locomotive of the time was built for the Union Railroad.  This 2-8-0 had more weight on its drivers (208,000 pounds) than any built up to that time.  This was locomotive 95 in the U.R.R. stable and according to the article was built by Pittsburg(h)(sic) Locomotive Works.
In the 1930s the Lima Locomotive Works began to build oversized 0-6-0s for use on the URR.  These were among the largest 0-6-0s ever built.
The 0-10-2 wheel arrangement was named the Union type after the railroad and produced over 100,000 pounds of tractive effort. Built for the Union RR by the Baldwin Locomotive Works, they boasted the title of "largest steam switch locomotive ever produced". The Union RR took delivery of 10 such locomotives. Only one survives today and is on static display in Greenville, Pennsylvania, painted as Duluth, Missabe and Iron Range (DM&IR) #604.

References

Official Union Railroad site
Union Railroad

Pennsylvania railroads
Switching and terminal railroads
Industrial railroads in the United States
U.S. Steel